The Abyss is a 1968 novel by the Belgian-French writer Marguerite Yourcenar. Its narrative centers on the life and death of Zeno, a physician, philosopher, scientist and alchemist born in Bruges during the Renaissance era. The book was published in France in 1968 and was met with immediate popular interest as well as critical acclaim, obtaining the Prix Femina with unanimous votes the year of its publication. The English translation by Grace Frick has been published under the title The Abyss or alternatively Zeno of Bruges. Belgian filmmaker André Delvaux adapted it into a film in 1988.

Plot
Zeno, an illegitimate son, is born in the Ligre household, a rich banking family of Bruges. Zeno renounces a comfortable career in the priesthood and leaves home to find truth at the age of 20. In his youth, after leaving Bruges, he greedily seeks knowledge by roaming the roads of Europe and beyond, leaving in his wake a nearly legendary — but also dangerous — reputation of genius due to the works he accomplishes.

Themes
The novel is set principally in Flanders of the 16th century, in the period opening the Early modern era of booming capitalistic economy, of renewed approaches to sciences, of religious upheavals (notably the Münster Rebellion) and bloody counter-Reformation, to the background of incessant wars between countries and the creeping chaos of the Black Death. In this setting, Zeno, the main character, is portrayed as a Renaissance Man of great intelligence and talent whose freedom of thoughts will come to be tested by the confines of his time.

Title
The French title L'Oeuvre au noir refers to the first step (nigredo) of the three steps the completion of which is required to achieve the Magnum opus in the discipline of alchemy, whose ultimate goal is to transmute lesser metals into gold or to create the Philosopher's stone.

In Yourcenar's own words, "In alchemical treatises, the formula L'Oeuvre au Noir, designates what is said to be the most difficult phase of the alchemist's process, the separation and dissolution of substance. It is still not clear whether the term applied to daring experiments on matter itself, or whether it was understood to symbolize trials of the mind in discarding all forms of routine and prejudice. Doubtless it signified one or the other meaning alternately, or perhaps both at the same time."

The English title The Abyss gives a slightly different lead by the evocation of fathomless depths, a likely image of the alchemist's inner journey, which are at the same time a Christian vision of hell, to which his contemporaries may wish to condemn him.

See also

Illegitimacy in fiction
Le Monde 100 Books of the Century

References

Abyss, The
1968 French novels
Novels by Marguerite Yourcenar
French historical novels
Novels set in the Renaissance
Novels set in Belgium
Belgian novels adapted into films
French novels adapted into films
Novels set in the 16th century
Fiction about alchemy